Robert or Bob Morris may refer to:

Politics
 Robert Hunter Morris (1700–1764), lieutenant governor of Colonial Pennsylvania
 Robert Morris (financier) (1734–1806), financier of the American Revolution and signatory to three of the United States' major founding documents
 Robert Morris (Bartlett), a 1923 statue of the American founding father and financier by Paul Wayland Bartlett
 Robert Morris (MP) (died 1816), English politician
 Robert Morris (judge) (1745–1815), American federal judge
 Robert H. Morris (mayor) (1808–1855), mayor of New York City
 Page Morris (Robert Page Waller Morris, 1853–1924), U.S. representative from Minnesota
 Robert J. Morris (1914–1996), anti-Communist crusader, lawyer, and politician
 Robert Morris (Denver mayor) (1838–1917), mayor of Denver, Colorado
 Robert Morris (Indiana politician), member of the Indiana House of Representatives

Authors, artists, and entertainers
 Robert Morris (writer) (1703–1754), English writer on architecture
 Robert Tuttle Morris (1857–1945), U.S. surgeon and writer
 Robert Schofield Morris (1898–1964), Canadian architect
 Robert Morris (artist) (1931–2018), American contemporary artist
 Robert Morris (actor) (born 1940), British actor
 Robert Morris (composer) (born 1943), British-American composer
 Robert Morris-Nunn (born 1949), Australian architect
 Robert Morris (author) (born 1950), American author
 Colonel Robert Morris (1954–2013), American musician
 Bob Morris (musician) (born 1985), songwriter, singer, and guitarist of Stamps
 Robert Lee Morris, German-born jewelry designer
 Robert Michael Morris (1940–2017), American actor

Sports
 Rob Morris (American football) (born 1975), retired American football linebacker
 Robbie Morris (born 1982), English rugby union player
 Robert Morris (basketball) (1902–1986), collegiate and professional basketball head coach
 Robert Morris Colonials, the athletic program of Robert Morris University in Pennsylvania
 Bob Morris (racing driver) (born 1948), touring car racer, winner of 1976 Bathurst 1000
 Robert Morris (Welsh footballer) (1875–?), Welsh international
 Robert Morris (English footballer) (1913–?), English footballer
 Robert Morris (cricketer) (1926–2007), Welsh cricketer
 Bob Morris (football manager), Papua New Guinean football manager

Universities 
 Robert Morris University, Pittsburgh, Pennsylvania, named after financier Robert Morris
 Robert Morris University Illinois, Chicago, Illinois, named after financier Robert Morris

Others
 Robert L. Morris (1942–2004), first holder of the Koestler Chair of Parapsychology at the University of Edinburgh
 Robert Morris (cryptographer) (1932–2011), American cryptographer and former chief scientist of the National Security Agency
 Robert Tappan Morris (born 1965), son of the cryptographer, creator of the first Internet worm
 Robert Morris (lawyer) (1823–1882), early African-American attorney
 Robert Morris (mathematician)
 Robert Murray Morris (1824–1896), officer in the U.S. Army and Union Army
 Robert Morris (historian) (–2022), English historian

See also 
 Rob Morris (disambiguation)
 Bert Morris (disambiguation)